Belgorod Province was an administrative of the Tsardom of Moscow and the Russian Empire in 1719—1775.

External links
 http://geo.1september.ru/view_article.php?ID=200101502

States and territories established in 1719
1775 disestablishments
1719 establishments in Russia
Provinces of the Russian Empire